Abo is an unincorporated community in Torrance County, New Mexico, United States, located on U.S. Route 60. It is the nearest community to Abo, a pueblo ruin and mission ruin that is a National Historic Landmark. A post office operated here from 1910 to 1914.

References

Unincorporated communities in New Mexico
Unincorporated communities in Torrance County, New Mexico
Albuquerque metropolitan area